Wheathampstead railway station was a railway station  serving Wheathampstead on the Great Northern Railway branch line to Dunstable. While little of it remains now, east of Wheathampstead is the Ayot Greenway which follows what was the line towards Welwyn Garden City.

The station opened with the rest of the Hatfield section of the line on 1 September 1860. Although a small goods yard and cattle dock were built, the close proximity of the road and housing meant that it remained a single platform only, with no passing loop unlike the stations at Harpenden East and Ayot. The station closed to passengers in 1965 with the track lifted a short time afterwards.

Local volunteers, with financial support from the Parish Council, local businesses and local residents, have restored the platform. A short length of railway line has been laid, together with a restored wagon, a platform shelter, information boards and a picnic table. The site is included in the Wheathampstead Village Centre Heritage Trail.

Routes

References

External links 
 Wheathampstead railway station entry on Subterranea Britannica Disused Sites website
 Wheathampstead station on navigable 1946 O. S. map

Disused railway stations in Hertfordshire
Former Great Northern Railway stations
Railway stations in Great Britain opened in 1860
Railway stations in Great Britain closed in 1965
1860 establishments in England
1965 disestablishments in England
Beeching closures in England
railway station